Ndunga (Bondonga, Modunga, Mondugu, Mondunga) is a Ubangian language spoken in 8 villages of Lisala Territory in Mongala Province, DR Congo (Ethnologue, 22nd ed.).

References

Mba languages
Languages of the Democratic Republic of the Congo